William E. Robertson was an American baseball executive who served as the president of the Buffalo Blues of the Federal League in 1914 and 1915.  He also managed concessions at Griffith Stadium.

References

Federal League executives
Year of birth missing
Year of death missing